New Haven is a coastal city in the U.S. state of Connecticut.

New Haven may also refer to:

Places

United States

 New Haven, California, now called Alvarado
 New Haven County, Connecticut
 New Haven, Illinois
 New Haven, Indiana
 New Haven, Kentucky
 New Haven, Michigan
 New Haven, Missouri 
 New Haven, New York
 New Haven, Hamilton County, Ohio
 New Haven, Huron County, Ohio
 New Haven, Pennsylvania, now part of Connellsville, Pennsylvania
 New Haven, Vermont 
 New Haven, West Virginia
 New Haven, Adams County, Wisconsin
 New Haven, Dunn County, Wisconsin
 New Haven Colony, an English colonial venture in present-day Connecticut from 1637 to 1662

Elsewhere
 New Haven, Falkland Islands
 New Haven, Enugu, Nigeria
 New Haven, an old name For Le Havre, France, when it was in English hands in Elizabethan times

Other uses
University of New Haven, Connecticut, U.S.
New York, New Haven and Hartford Railroad, known as the New Haven, 1872–1968
New Haven 600, a series of shotguns
New Haven, a fictional settlement in Borderlands (series)

See also 
Haven (disambiguation)
Newhaven (disambiguation)